Al-Ja'una or Ja'ouna (Arabic: الجاعونة), was a Palestinian village situated in Galilee near al-Houleh Plateau, overlooking the Jordan Valley. The village lay on a hillside 450–500 meters above sea level, 5 kilometers east of Safad near a major road connecting Safad with Tabariya. The Israeli town of Rosh Pinna (Hebrew:ראש פינה) sits on the former village site, which was expanded to include the depopulated Palestinian Al-Ja'una.

History
Broken pillars and a capital has been found here.

Ottoman era
Al-Ja'una was mentioned in the 1596 Ottoman census as being a village in the nahiya (subdistrict) of Jira, in the  Safad Sanjak, with 27 households and 4 bachelors, an estimated population of 171. All the villagers were Muslim. The villagers paid a fixed tax rate of 25% on various agricultural products, such as wheat, barley, olives, goats, beehives, and a powered mill; a total of 2,832 akçe. 1/12 of the revenue went to a Muslim charitable institution.

The village appeared under the name of Gahoun on the map that Pierre Jacotin compiled during Napoleon's invasion of 1799.

In 1875, Victor Guérin found that Al-Ja'una had 200 Muslim inhabitants.

In 1881  the PEF's Survey of Western Palestine described it as a stone village of 140-200 residents who grew figs and olives. There were two springs in a wadi, south of the village. A mosque and an elementary school for boys was established in the village in Ottoman times.

The settlement of Rosh Pinna is located to the southeast of the village site. It was first established in 1878 on land purchased from the villagers of al-Ja'una but has expanded over the years to include part of the former village land of Al-Ja'una.

Laurence Oliphant visited Rosh Pinna and Al-Ja'una in 1886, and wrote:
 "Jauna, which was the name of the village to which I was bound, was situated about three miles (5 km) from Safad, in a gorge, from which, as we descended it, a magnificent view was obtained over the Jordan valley, with the Lake of Tiberias lying three thousand feet below us on the right, and the waters of Merom, or the Lake of Huleh, on the left. The intervening plain was a rich expanse of country, only waiting development. The new colony had been established about eight months, the land having been purchased from the Moslem villagers, of whom twenty families remained, who lived on terms of perfect amity with the Jews."

A population list from about 1887 showed  Ja’auneh to have  about 930  inhabitants; 555 Muslims and 375 Druze.

British Mandate era

In the 1922 census of Palestine, conducted by the  British Mandate authorities, Ja'uneh  had a population of 626; all Muslims,  increasing in the 1931 census to 799, still all  Muslims,  in  a total of 149  houses.

Felix Salten visited Rosh Pinna in 1924 and noted also Al-Ja’una in his travel book Neue Menschen auf alter Erde:
“Right next to Rosh Pin[n]a, the Arab village Dzha’une. These early settlers still employ Arab workers, a practice that naturally had to cease within the new rebuilding movement. The Arabian children of Dzha’une all go to school that has been built for them by the settlement [of Rosh Pinna] and they are taught Hebrew there.”

In the  1945 statistics  the population was 1,150 Muslims, and the total land area was 839  dunums; 824 of which were owned by Arabs, 7 by Jews, and 8 public.   Of this,  172 dunums were  plantations and irrigable land, 248  used for cereals, while 43 dunams were built-up (urban) land.

1948 Arab-Israeli war, depopulation, and aftermath

The village was depopulated during the 1948 Arab–Israeli War. According to Israeli historian Benny Morris, the evacuation of the residents took place either in late April, or on 9 May, coinciding with the final attack on Safad.

At midnight on 5–6 June 1949, the remaining villagers in Al-Ja'una (together with those of Al-Khisas and Qaytiyya) were surrounded by Israeli Defence Force units, who then forced the villagers into trucks "with brutality—with kicks, curses and maltreatment...." (according to Knesset member and Al HaMishmar editor Eliezer Peri) and left them on a hill near 'Akbara. When questioned about the expulsions, David Ben-Gurion responded that there was "sufficient" military justification. 'Akbara served as a "dumping spot" for the "remainders" from various depopulated Palestinian villages, and its conditions were to remain bad for years.

Walid Khalidi, writing in 1992 about the remains of Al-Ja'una, stated: "The settlement of Rosh Pinna occupies the village site. Many of the houses remain; some are used by the residents of the settlement; other stone houses have been abandoned and destroyed."

See also 
 1948 Palestinian exodus
 List of villages depopulated during the Arab–Israeli conflict
 Abdallah Al-Asbah

References

Bibliography

 
 
 
 

 

  

 (p. 71)

External links 
Welcome To al-Ja'una, Palestine Remembered
 Al-Ja'una,  Zochrot
Survey of Western Palestine, Map 4: IAA, Wikimedia commons  
al-Ja'una, from the Khalil Sakakini Cultural Center
Al-Ja`una, Dr. Khalil Rizk.
Al-Ja3ooneh, from Dr. Moslih Kanaaneh
 UN map of the 1947 plan
 The Destroyed Palestinian Villages on Google Earth
Tracing all That Remains of al-Ja'una-جاعونة المدمرة-فلسطين, video, YouTube

District of Safad
Arab villages depopulated during the 1948 Arab–Israeli War